Motiur Rahman (born 9 July 1942) is a Bangladesh Awami League politician who served as the Minister of Religious Affairs.

Early life
Rahman was born on 9 July 1942 in Akua, Mymensingh Sadar Upazila, Mymensingh District in the then Bengal Presidency, British India. He graduated from Akua Model Primary School in 1953. He joined Mymensingh Zilla School in 1957 and then went to Nokla High School. In 1961, he graduated from Ananda Mohan College and in 1964 he earned his undergraduate degree from the same college. In 1967, he graduated with a master's in zoology from the University of Dhaka.

Career
Rahman started teaching at Nandina College in Jamalpur District and than taught at the Nasirabad College in Mymensingh District. In 1969, he founded the Alamgir Mansur Mintu Memorial College and served as its principal until 2002. In 1971, he fought in the Bangladesh Liberation war. He taught for while at the Mymensingh College.  In 2002, he founded Matiur Rahman Academy School and College and appointed himself its principal. He founded Nasirabad Girls' School, Shaheed Syed Nazrul Islam College, and Meher Razzak Private Primary School. He served as the chairman of Nasirabad College, Mymensingh College, Mymensingh Women's Degree College, Islamic Academy, and Akuabari Madrasa Management Committee.

Rahman served as the general secretary of Mymensingh District Awami League. He was elected to Parliament from Mymensingh-4 in 1986, 1996, and 2008. On 12 January 2014, he was appointed the Minister of Religious Affairs.

Rahman named a government funded hospital after his deceased son which generated controversy in the news media about the appropriate use of public funds. He famously used Arabic language inscriptions on walls to prevent public urination.

On 22 January 2022, Rahman was awarded the Ekushey Padak, the second most important award for civilians in Bangladesh.

References

Living people
1942 births
University of Dhaka alumni
Awami League politicians
7th Jatiya Sangsad members
9th Jatiya Sangsad members
Religious affairs ministries of Bangladesh
Recipients of the Ekushey Padak